Credo is a strategy card game for two to five players, designed by Chris V. Gidlow, and first published by Chaosium in 1993.

Description
The game comes with two decks of cards, two eight-page rule booklets, and four paper display sheets. It is set in the early history of the Christian Church and is based on hypothetical alternatives to how the Nicene Creed, its contents, and what would be seen as heresy might have been decided upon by a series of Ecumenical councils and the influence of the Roman Emperor (particularly Constantine I).

Players use cards to set up their own Articles of Faith and Firm Beliefs, while using other cards to shore up their followers by proselytizing, and by persecuting their fellow players.

Victory
The first player to either gain 11 million followers or gain 117 votes on the Council wins the game.

Reception
In the June 1994 edition of Dragon (Issue 206), Rick Swan thought it was too expensive ($15), but still playable, saying, "Considering the meager components, this is way overpriced. But there’s no denying the play value. Heavenly!"

References

External links
 Chaosium's entry on Credo
 Chris Gidlow's gaming page

Card games introduced in 1993
Chaosium games